William Francis Galvin (born ) is an American politician who serves as the 27th Massachusetts Secretary of the Commonwealth.

Early life
Galvin was born and raised in the Brighton neighborhood of Boston.  He was taught by the Christian Brothers at Saint Mary's High School in Waltham, Massachusetts, class of 1968. He attended Boston College and graduated cum laude in 1972. He received a Juris Doctor from Suffolk University Law School in 1976.

Career

Galvin began his political career in 1972 as an aide to the Massachusetts Governor's Council after graduating from Boston College, thanks to his connection with councilor Herb Connolly, whom Galvin had campaigned for. Galvin worked part-time at the council while attending Suffolk Law School full-time. Galvin won a special election to the open seat in the Massachusetts General Court in 1975, after State Representative Michael Daly departed from office; the race had nine candidates.  Galvin became the Massachusetts state representative from the Allston-Brighton district, the same year he graduated from law school. He was the Democratic nominee for Massachusetts State Treasurer in 1990, but was defeated by Republican Joe Malone. It was during this election that he was given the nickname "The Prince of Darkness", in reference to his habit of working late into the night and making legislative deals behind closed doors. He was first elected Secretary of the Commonwealth in 1994, and has retained this title longer than any other politician in Massachusetts history, second only to his last Republican predecessor, Frederic W. Cook, who held the office for 28 years.

Galvin has been an active participant in the National Association of Secretaries of State, serving first as Chairman of the Standing Committee on Securities, then as co-chairman of the Committee on Presidential Primaries.

At one point during the administration of Gov. Mitt Romney and Lt. Gov. Kerry Healey, Galvin became the Acting Governor of Massachusetts when both Romney and Healey were out of the state.  During the administration of former Acting Governor Jane Swift, Galvin automatically became Acting Governor whenever Swift left the state, since there was no lieutenant governor in office at the time.  When Swift gave birth to twins in 2001, she chose to keep full executive authority and did not hand over the governorship at any point to Galvin.

2006 election

While it had been widely rumored that Galvin would run for Governor of Massachusetts in 2006 as a Democrat, he announced at the end of 2005 that he would instead seek reelection as Secretary of State.  Voting rights advocate John Bonifaz had already declared that he would run for the office, and stayed in the race to challenge Galvin for re-election. However, Galvin defeated Bonifaz in the September 19 Democratic primary. Galvin defeated Green-Rainbow Party candidate Jill Stein, a medical doctor and environmental health advocate who ran for Governor in 2002, in the November general election.

The Democratic primary race received relatively little attention or press coverage for most of 2006, but in the last few weeks before election, a controversy over Galvin's refusal to debate his opponent broke into the news with a front-page story in The Boston Sunday Globe. This is the first time a front-page story appeared about this race in any major Boston paper.

2018 election

In November 2017, Boston City Council member Josh Zakim announced that he would run for Secretary of the Commonwealth, challenging fellow-Democrat Galvin in the 2018 election. Amid the primary challenge, Galvin came out in favor of same-day voter registration and automatic voter registration. Previously, Galvin had expressed skepticism of automatic voter registration, and had appealed a Superior Court ruling which struck down a state law requiring that voters be registered 20 days prior to an election in order to vote in it. On June 2, 2018, Zakim won the endorsement of the Massachusetts Democratic Party at its state convention, defeating Galvin, 55% to 45%. Galvin subsequently defeated Zakim in the Democratic primary on September 4, with 67% of the vote. On November 6, Galvin won re-election as Secretary of the Commonwealth.

Notable lawsuits

2008 UOCAVA violation settlement with Department of Justice
Galvin, as the Massachusetts' Secretary of State, was found to have violated the Uniformed and Overseas Citizens Absentee Voting Act passed in 2002. The Office of the Secretary of the Commonwealth, since the law had been enacted, had failed to report and collect the number sent and the number returned of absentee ballots from overseas Military personnel registered to vote in Massachusetts. After an investigation by the US Justice Department, a settlement was reached, requiring Galvin to comply with the law.  The law requires each state (or commonwealth) to report on the ballots no later than 90 days after the date of each regularly scheduled general election for federal office. Each state must also make such a report available to the general public. The Justice Department's Civil Rights Division enforces the UOCAVA and the Voting Rights Act.

2009 lawsuit against stockbroker Robert Jaffe
On January 14, 2009, Galvin filed suit against Robert Jaffe to compel Jaffe to testify about his role in the Bernard Madoff investment scandal. Jaffe, who lives in Weston, Massachusetts, and in Florida, counters that he is actually one of the victims of Madoff. Jaffe is married to Ellen Shapiro, daughter of Boston philanthropist Carl Shapiro. Jaffe reportedly convinced the elder Shapiro to invest $250 million with Madoff about 10 days before Madoff's arrest.

2021 Regulatory action against MassMutual in GameStop affair
In September 2021 the Massachusetts regulators fined MassMutual $4m for failing to supervise the trading activity of their employee Keith Gill, a leading player in the GameStop short squeeze which led to hedge funds losing billions. Galvin characterised Gill as a professional trader/dealer, citing his 1700 trades on behalf of 3 other individuals. However, Galvin failed to disclose that the 3 individuals were all members of Gill's family and that less than 5% of the 1700 trades were for GameStop.

Electoral history

References

Further reading

External links

 Secretary of the Commonwealth of Massachusetts official page
 Galvin Campaign website
 
 
 

|-

|-

|-

1950 births
21st-century American politicians
Boston College alumni
Living people
Democratic Party members of the Massachusetts House of Representatives
People associated with the Madoff investment scandal
Politicians from Boston
Secretaries of the Commonwealth of Massachusetts
Suffolk University Law School alumni